Alumni Stadium is a stadium in Chestnut Hill, Massachusetts, US. 

Other stadiums with this name include:

Alumni Stadium (BJU), Greenville, South Carolina
Alumni Stadium (Delaware State), Dover, Delaware
Alumni Stadium (Fairfield), Fairfield, Connecticut
Alumni Stadium (Guelph), Guelph, Ontario
Alumni Stadium (Kean University), Union, New Jersey
Alumni Stadium (Maine), Orono, Maine
Alumni Stadium (Notre Dame), Notre Dame, Indiana
Alumni Stadium (WPI), Worcester, Massachusetts
Alumni Memorial Stadium (Livingstone), Salisbury, North Carolina
Abbott Memorial Alumni Stadium, Tuskegee, Alabama
Albert J. Sloan–Alumni Stadium, Fairfield, Alabama
Coughlin–Alumni Stadium, Brookings, South Dakota
Warren McGuirk Alumni Stadium, Amherst, Massachusetts
Western Alumni Stadium, London, Ontario

See also
Alumni Field (disambiguation)